Nili Cohen (born 1947) is an Israeli professor and legal expert. She is a recipient of the Israel Prize, and is the President of the Israel Academy of Sciences and Humanities, succeeding Prof. Ruth Arnon, Cohen's role model.

Biography
Nili Cohen was born in Kfar Saba, 1947. She grew up and was educated in Tel Aviv and graduated from Ironi Dalet High School. Her father was a teacher in that city. Cohen's grandmother, Batsheva (Bertha) Friedberg Grabelsky, lived in Manhattan, and married a Belarus immigrant, Boris Grabelsky. Bertha was an editor, translator, Hebraist, and Zionist, who, in the 1920s, published Eden, a newspaper for Jewish teenagers.

An alumnus of Tel Aviv University (TAU), where Cohen received her LL.B., LL.M., and Ph.D. degrees, she was the co-founding editor of the TAU Law Review. In 1998, Cohen received an Honorary Degree from the University of Buenos Aires.

She serves as the Benno Gitter Chair in Comparative Contract Law and is the director of the Beverly and Raymond Sackler Fund for Human Rights in Private Law. From 1994 to 1997, she was the Vice-Rector (1994–1997) of TAU, and served as the Rector from 1997 till 2001. She is the Professor emeritus of TAU's Buchmann Faculty of Law. Cohen became a member of the Israel Academy of Sciences in 2004, and was elected its president in 2015.

She was a candidate for Supreme Court of Israel, but her appointment was blocked in a process that garnered political attention.

Cohen is a widow; her husband, Amiram Cohen, had been a lawyer. They have two daughters and one son.

Affiliations
 Member, American Law Institute
 Member, Academic Council of Venice International University
 Associate Member, International Academy for Comparative Law
 Former member, Committee of the Codification of Israeli Law
 Member, American Philosophical Society

Awards
 2003/4, 2004/5, and 2014/5, Rector Prize for Excellence in Teaching
 2002, Minkoff Prize for excellence in Law
 1986 and 1991, Sussman Prize
 1989, Zeltner Prize

Selected works
 Interference with Contractual Relations
 Inducing Breach of Contract
 Contracts A, B, C, D (co-author)
 Comparative Remedies for Breach of Contract (edited with Ewan McKendrick; also contributed a chapter)

References

1947 births
Living people
People from Kfar Saba
Israeli academic administrators
Israeli legal scholars
Tel Aviv University alumni
Academic staff of Tel Aviv University
Members of the Israel Academy of Sciences and Humanities
Israel Prize women recipients
Scholars of contract law
Members of the American Philosophical Society